Non-Prophets, not to be confused with a Non-profit organization, may refer to:

 Non-Prophets Radio, an Internet radio show and podcast
 Non-Prophets, an American hip-hop band